YOU is a South African family magazine that is aimed at demographically diverse South African English-speaking readers of different ethnicities with coverage on current events and "interesting people".

History and profile
The YOU magazine was launched in 1987 by Nasionale Pers, which later became Media24.  It was aimed at white, English speaking, South Africans. The magazine is published in Cape Town by Media24, the print division of Naspers. The magazine is published on a weekly basis. It has two sister magazines: Huisgenoot (aimed at White and Coloured Afrikaans-speaking readers) and Drum (aimed at Black English, Sotho and Zulu - speaking readers).

References

External links

1987 establishments in South Africa
Celebrity magazines
English-language magazines published in South Africa
Magazines established in 1987
Mass media in Cape Town
Magazines published in South Africa
Weekly magazines published in South Africa